Military relations between Pakistan and the United States have been present since the two established diplomatic relations in 1947. The United States' military relations with Pakistan used to be close and it once occupied as "America's most allied ally in Asia", reflecting shared interests in security and stability in South Asia, Central Asia as well as in regions covering Eastern Europe.

The military establishments of both countries have cooperated in taking action against militant groups involved in the War in Afghanistan and the Bosnian War while cooperating on shared mutual understanding of key issues in security and defense. The Pakistan Army and Pakistan Air Force regularly engage in joint exercises with their American counter interservices, while the Pakistan Navy and the Pakistan Marines is the second most consistent participant in Combined Task Force 150 and Combined Task Force 151 after the United States Navy.

Since 1956, the U.S. military personnel have served in the Pakistani military as military advisers and Pakistani military cadets have consistently attended the coveted U.S. military academies and war colleges. U.S. force relations with Military of Pakistan has been replaced by the People's Liberation Army of China.

The US Commerce Department's Bureau of Industry and Security (BIS) already added Pakistani companies on a US trade blacklist for their alleged involvement in missile and nuclear activities, making it difficult for these companies to do business internationally.

U.S. bases
The following military bases in Pakistan have been accessible to the United States, mainly for logistics, relief efforts or as launching bases for drone operations. Pakistan comes under the United States Central Command (USCENTCOM) theatre of operations. The Afghanistan-Pakistan Center of Excellence is a division of USCENTCOM, focusing on analysis of operations in Pakistan and Afghanistan (formerly known as the AfPak theatre). Currently, there are no U.S. bases in Pakistan.

Gallery

See also

 Pakistan–United States relations
 Pakistan–United States skirmishes
 NATO–Pakistan relations

References

 
United States
Bilateral military relations of the United States
Military
Military diplomacy